The Swedish Basketball Federation also known as SBBF is the governing body of basketball in Sweden. It was established on 25 October 1952 out of the Swedish Handball Federation's basketball section, which had been started in 1948. Its headquarters are in Stockholm.

The Swedish Basketball Federation operates the Sweden men's national basketball team and Sweden women's national team. They organize national competitions in Sweden, for both the men's and women's senior teams and also the youth national basketball teams.

The top professional league in Sweden is the Basketligan.

See also 
Sweden men's national basketball team
Sweden men's national under-18 basketball team
Sweden men's national under-16 basketball team
Sweden women's national basketball team
Sweden women's national under-18 basketball team
Sweden women's national under-16 basketball team

References

External links 
Official website 
Sweden at FIBA site

Basketball
Fed
Basketball governing bodies in Europe
Sports organizations established in 1952